Calleonasus is an extinct genus of non-mammalian synapsid from the Anisian Donguz Formation of Russia.

See also 
 List of therapsids

References

External links 
 The main groups of non-mammalian synapsids at Mikko's Phylogeny Archive

Dicynodonts
Triassic animals of Europe
Triassic animals of Asia
Anisian life
Triassic Russia
Fossils of Russia
Fossil taxa described in 1985
Anomodont genera